The UEFA Euro 1972 quarter-finals was the last round of qualifying competition for UEFA Euro 1972. They were contested by the eight group winners of the qualifying tournament. The winners of each of four home-and-away ties qualified for the finals tournament in Belgium. The matches were played on 29–30 April and 13–14 May 1972, with a replay on 17 May 1972.

Qualification

Each group winner progressed to the quarter-finals. The quarter-finals were played in two legs on a home-and-away basis. The winners of the quarter-finals would go through to the final tournament.

Summary

|}

Matches
The eight matches took place over two legs, the first being on 29 and 30 April 1972, and the second on 13 and 14 May 1972. A third leg would be played for any matches tied on aggregate after the second leg. All times are CET (UTC+1).

Belgium won 2–1 on aggregate and qualified for UEFA Euro 1972.

3–3 on aggregate. A replay was played on a neutral ground to determine the winner.

Hungary won 5–4 on aggregate and qualified for UEFA Euro 1972.

West Germany won 3–1 on aggregate and qualified for UEFA Euro 1972.

Soviet Union won 3–0 on aggregate and qualified for UEFA Euro 1972.

Goalscorers

References

External links
UEFA Euro 1972 qualifying

Play-offs
1971–72 in Italian football
1971–72 in Belgian football
1971–72 in Hungarian football
1971–72 in Romanian football
1971–72 in English football
West Germany at UEFA Euro 1972
1971–72 in German football
1971–72 in Yugoslav football
1972 in Soviet football
England–Germany football rivalry
Belgium at UEFA Euro 1972
Hungary at UEFA Euro 1972
Soviet Union at UEFA Euro 1972